Aulichev is a Russian masculine surname, its feminine counterpart is Aulicheva. It originates from the Russian given name Vavula (Vavila).

References

Russian-language surnames